Benguellia is a genus of plants in the family Lamiaceae, first described in 1931. It contains only one known species, Benguellia lanceolata, endemic to Angola.

References

Lamiaceae
Endemic flora of Angola
Monotypic Lamiaceae genera